The W.R. Bunckley House is a historic house at 509 East Parker Street in Hamburg, Arkansas.  It is the earliest and best preserved example of a Folk Victorian house in the community.  It was built in 1903 for W. R. Bunckley, an American Civil War veteran who had married the daughter of David Watson, a successful local businessman whose grand mansion still stands nearby.  This -story wood-frame house is a rambling, asymmetrical vernacular expression of Queen Anne styling.  The principal focus of this styling on the outside is the wraparound porch, which features detailed turned and jigsaw woodwork.  Interior decorations, including turned woodwork and stained glass, are also well preserved.

The house was listed on the National Register of Historic Places in 1994.

See also
National Register of Historic Places listings in Ashley County, Arkansas

References

Houses on the National Register of Historic Places in Arkansas
Houses in Ashley County, Arkansas
National Register of Historic Places in Ashley County, Arkansas
Victorian architecture in Arkansas
1903 establishments in Arkansas
Houses completed in 1903
Hamburg, Arkansas